Herbert Kögl (born March 22, 1966) is an Austrian luger who has competed since 1988. A natural track luger, he won six medals at the FIL World Luge Natural Track Championships with two gold (Men's doubles: 1996, Mixed team: 2005), one silver (2000), and three bronzes (Men's doubles: 1992, 1998; Mixed team: 2007).

Kögl also won two medals in the men's doubles event at the FIL European Luge Natural Track Championships with a silver in 2002 and a bronze in 1997.

References
FIL-Luge profile: Kögl, Herbert
Natural track European Championships results 1970-2006.
Natural track World Championships results: 1979-2007

External links
 

1966 births
Living people
Austrian male lugers